The Men's 4 × 200 metre freestyle relay competition at the 2017 World Championships was held on 28 July 2017. .

Records
Prior to the competition, the existing world and championship records were as follows.

Results

Heats
The heats were held on 28 July at 10:47.

Final
The final was held on 28 July at 19:12.

References

Men's 4 x 200 metre freestyle relay